Bhandarkoot (also spelt as Bandarkoot) is a village in the Kishtwar district of Jammu and Kashmir in India. Bhandarkoot is known for Bhandarkoot Ziyarat, a holy shrine of Hazrat Sheikh Zain-ud-din Rishi. At Bhandarkoot is the junction of the Marusudar, a river tributary which joins the Chenab river at this place.

Marusudar River

Marusudar River is the river tributary of the Chenab River, beginning at the Nunkun glacier of the Warwan Valley and later joins the river Chenab at Bhandarkoot.

Bhandarkoot Astaan
At Bhandarkoot, a holy shrine or Astaan of the saint “Shah Zain-ud-Din” is located on the left bank of the Chenab river. At this astaan cocks and sheep are sacrificed to seek the saint's blessings by the Hindu as well as Muslim communities.

References

Villages in Kishtwar district